William Jerome Harrison FGS (16 March 1845 – 6 June 1908), was a British geologist, science writer, and amateur photographer who wrote several textbooks on chemistry, physics, photography, and geology, including the first geological book illustrated with photographs. Born in Hemsworth, Yorkshire, he was educated at Westminster Training College, and afterwards for two years at Cheltenham College. For many years he was curator of the Leicester Town Museum. In 1880 he moved to Birmingham, where he was appointed Chief Science Master under the Birmingham School Board. His books include A History of Photography, The Chemistry of Photography, and Geology of the Counties of England and of North and South Wales. Harrison is also credited with being the founder of the National Photographic Record and Survey Movement which led to the formation of the National Photographic Record Association in 1897.

He edited, jointly with Edward W. Badger, volumes 1 to 9 of The Midland Naturalist, the journal of the Midland Union of Natural History Societies, to which he also contributed articles. In 1885 he was awarded the Union's Darwin Prize for original research in geology.

References

External links

  

1845 births
1908 deaths
19th-century British geologists
People educated at Cheltenham College
People from Hemsworth
Photographers from Yorkshire
Fellows of the Geological Society of London
19th-century English photographers